Georgi Georgiev-Getz (October 4, 1926 – September 2, 1996) was a Bulgarian film and stage actor.

Best known for portraying valiant and honest conservative men, Getz was among the prominent names in the Bulgarian cinematography and theatre during the second half of the 20th century. He appeared in many of the Bulgarian film classics such as We Were Young (1961), The Tied Up Balloon (1967), The Eighth (1969), Thorn Apple (1972), Matriarchy (1977) and probably his most notable role as Yordan in A Peasant on a Bicycle (1974) for which he received an award for Best Actor at the 9th Moscow International Film Festival in 1975.

Biography and career 
He was born as Georgi Ivanov Georgiev on October 4, 1926 in the village of Razpopovtsi, today neighborhood of the town of Elena, Bulgaria. In 1947, after finishing the secondary school, he went to Sofia where he enrolled in acting at The National Academy for Theatre and Film Arts graduating in 1953. After the graduation, Getz joined the troupe of the Ivan Vazov National Theatre where he remained for almost his whole career until 1990.

Georgi Georgiev-Getz died as a result of a stroke on September 2, 1996 in Sofia, Bulgaria.

Full filmography

 Utro nad Rodinata (1951) as the Locksmith
in Bulgarian: Утро над Родината 
in English: Dawn Over the Homeland
 Nasha zemya (1952) as Dimo
in Bulgarian: Наша земя 
in English: Our Land
 Nespokoen pat (1955) as the Khazak
in Bulgarian: Неспокоен път 
in English: Troubled Road, a Man Decides
 Tochka parva (1956)
in Bulgarian: Точка първа 
in English:Item One
 Zakonat na moreto (1958) as Petar
in Bulgarian: Законът на морето 
in English: The Law of the Sea
 Parvi urok (1960) as Pesho's Brother
in Bulgarian: Първи урок 
in English: First Lesson
The Old Lady in the UK
 A byahme mladi (1961) as Mladen
in Bulgarian: А бяхме млади 
in English: We Were Young 
 Noshtta sreshtu trinadeseti (1961) as General
in Bulgarian: Нощта срещу тринадесети 
in English: On the Eve of the 13th
 Stramnata pateka (1961) as Ivan Diviya
in Bulgarian: Стръмната пътека 
in English: The Steep Path
 Zlatniyat zab (1962) as Captain Prodan Lipovski, The Golden Tooth
in Bulgarian: Златният зъб 
in English: The Golden Tooth
 Le Tueur à la rose rouge (1962)
in Bulgarian: Nur tote Zeugen schweigen 
in English: Le Tueur à la rose rouge
 Chernata reka (1964) as Dobri
in Bulgarian: Черната река 
in English: The Black River
 Neprimirimite (1964) as Atanas
in Bulgarian: Непримиримите 
in English: The Intransigents
 Mazhe (1966)
in Bulgarian: Мъже 
in English: Men
 Mezhdu dvamata (1966) as Halata, Plamen's father
in Bulgarian: Между двамата 
in English: Between Parents
 Nay-dalgata nosht (1967) as Stranger
in Bulgarian: Най-дългата нощ 
in English: The Longest Night
 S dah na bademi (1967) as Mihail Nikodimov
in Bulgarian: С дъх на бадеми 
in English: Taste of Almonds
 The Tied Up Balloon / Privarzaniyat balon (1967) as Peasant
in Bulgarian: Привързаният балон 
in English: The Tied Up Balloon
 Nebeto na Veleka (1968) as Martin
in Bulgarian: Небето на Велека 
in English: The Sky Over the Veleka
 Osmiyat (1969) as Osmiyat
in Bulgarian: Осмият 
in English: The Eighth
 Trugni na put (1969) as Predsedatelyat Radi Radulov
in Bulgarian: Тръгни на път 
in English: Set Out Again
 Na vseki kilometar (1969, TV Series) as the Voivode (unknown episodes)
in Bulgarian: На всеки километър 
in English: At Each Kilometer
 Chetirimata ot vagona (1970) as Kapitan Draganov
in Bulgarian: Четиримата от вагона 
in English: Four Men in a Boxcar
 Tzitadelata otgovori (1970) as Major Petar Hariev
in Bulgarian: Цитаделата отговори 
in English:  The Citadel Replied
 Nyama nishto po-hubavo ot loshoto vreme (1971) as Emil Boev
in Bulgarian: Няма нищо по-хубаво от лошото време 
in English: There Is Nothing Finer Than Bad Weather 
 Tatul (1972) as Ganchovski
in Bulgarian: Татул 
in English: Thorn Apple
 Igrek 17  (1973) as Kapitan Rudev
in Bulgarian: Игрек 17 
in English: Y-17
 Zarevo nad Drava (1974) as Major Boyan Vasilev
in Bulgarian: Зарево над Драва 
in English: Dawn Over the Drava
 Posledniyat ergen (1974) as the Colonel
in Bulgarian: Последният ерген 
in English: The Last Bachelor
 Selyaninat s Koleloto (1974) as Yordan
in Bulgarian: Селянинът с колелото 
in English: A Peasant on a Bicycle
 Dopalnenie kam zakona za zashtita na darzhavata (1976) as the Man with the cigarette
in Bulgarian: Допълнение към закона за защита на държавата 
in English: Amendment to the Law for the Defense of the State
 Matriarhat''' (1977) as Milor
in Bulgarian: Матриархат 
in English: Matriarchy
 Sami sred valtzi (1979, TV Series) as Geshev
in Bulgarian: Сами сред вълци 
in English: Alone Among Wolves
 Patyat kam Sofia (1979, TV Mini-Series) as Kliment Budinov
in Bulgarian: Пътят към София 
in English: The Way to Sofia
 Trite smurtni gryaha (1980) as Kuzdo Karakozov
in Bulgarian: Трите смъртни гряха 
in English: Three Deadly Sins
 Uoni (1980) as Ivan Gyaurov - Uoni
in Bulgarian: Уони 
in English: Wonny (Europe)
 Milost za zhivite (1981) as Bay Stefan
in Bulgarian: Милост за живите 
in English: Mercy for the Living
 Prishestvie (1981)
in Bulgarian: Пришествие 
in English: Advent
 Udarat (1981)
in Bulgarian: Ударът 
in English: The Thrust 
 Spirka "Berlin" (1982)
in Bulgarian: Спирка `Берлин` 
in English: 'Berlin' Station
 Nay-tezhkiyat gryah (1982) as Simeonov-Vedrin
in Bulgarian: Най-тежкият грях 
in English: The Worst Sin
 Niccolo Paganini (1982, TV Mini-Series)
 Ravnovesie (1983) as the Script-writer
in Bulgarian: Равновесие 
in English: Balance
 Otkoga te chakam (1984) as Former director
in Bulgarian: Откога те чакам 
in English: It's Nice to See You
 Stenata (1984) as Chichov
in Bulgarian: Стената 
in English: The Dam
 Mechtanie sam az (1985)
in Bulgarian: Мечтание съм аз 
in English: I Am a Dream
 Denyat na vladetelite (1986) as Dilon
in Bulgarian: Денят на владетелите 
in English: The Day of the Rulers
 Te naddelyaha (1986) as Bay Dragan
in Bulgarian: Те надделяха 
in English: They Prevailed
 Vasko de Gama ot selo Rupcha (1986, TV Series) as Captain of the Ship
in Bulgarian: Васко де Гама от село Рупча 
in English: Vasko de Gama from Rupcha Village
 Vecheri v Antimovskiya han (1988, TV Series) as Kalmuka
in Bulgarian: Вечери в Антимовския хан 
in English: Evenings in the Antim's Inn
 Prokurorat (1988) as the prosecutor Miladin Voynov
in Bulgarian: Прокурорът 
in English: The Prosecutor
 Zhivotut si teche tiho... (1988) as Petko
in Bulgarian: Животът си тече тихо... 
in English: Life Flows Slowly by...
 Bashta (1989) as the Father
in Bulgarian: Баща 
in English: Father
 Pravo na izbor (1989)
in Bulgarian: Право на избор 
in English: Right to Choose
 Pod igoto (1990, TV Series) as Chorbadzhi Marko
in Bulgarian: Под игото 
in English: Under the Yoke
 Kragovrat'' (1993) as Shanov (final film role)
in Bulgarian: Кръговрат 
in English: Circle

References

Sources

External links
 

1926 births
Bulgarian male film actors
Bulgarian male stage actors
1996 deaths
People from Elena, Bulgaria
20th-century Bulgarian male actors